Labatut (French pronunciation: [labaty]) is a French surname that may refer to the following notable people:

André Labatut (1891–1977), French fencer
Benjamín Labatut (born 1980), Chilean writer
 Jean Labatut (architect) (c. 1899–1986), American architect 
 Jean Labatut (sport shooter) (born 1971), Brazilian sports shooter
Guta Stresser (born Maria Augusta Labatut Stresser in 1972), Brazilian actress, writer, and theatre director
Pierre Labatut (1776–1849), French general

French-language surnames